That's It! is an album by American jazz saxophonist Booker Ervin featuring performances recorded in 1961 for the Candid label.

Reception
The contemporaneous DownBeat reviewer, Ira Gitler, commented that the album was Ervin's best work up to that time. The AllMusic review by Scott Yanow awarded the album 4½ stars and stated: "Booker Ervin, who always had a very unique sound on the tenor, is heard in prime form on his quartet set".

Track listing
All compositions by Booker Ervin except as indicated
 "Mojo" - 7:57 
 "Uranus" - 4:32 
 "Poinciana" (Buddy Bernier, Nat Simon) - 8:04 
 "Speak Low" (Ogden Nash, Kurt Weill) - 7:12 
 "Booker's Blues" - 10:59 
 "Boo" - 4:32 
Recorded at Nola Penthouse Studios in New York City on January 6, 1961.

Personnel
Booker Ervin - tenor saxophone
Horace Parlan - piano
George Tucker - bass
Al Harewood - drums

References 

Candid Records albums
Booker Ervin albums
1961 albums